Frederick, Prince of Hohenzollern (30 August 1891 in Heiligendamm, Mecklenburg-Schwerin – 6 February 1965 in Krauchenwies, Baden-Württemberg, Germany) was the eldest son of William, Prince of Hohenzollern and Princess Maria Teresa of Bourbon-Two Sicilies. He had a twin brother, Franz Joseph, Prince of Hohenzollern-Emden, who was born a few minutes after he was.

Life
After studying forestry and economics, he served with the 5th Reserve Mountain Battalion during World War I and retired from military service in 1919 with the rank of oberst. He then managed the Hohenzollern estate in Umkirch near Freiburg im Breisgau until his father's death in 1927. During the 1920s he was engaged in a dispute with the SPD Government over the use of his princely title and royal surname. The District President of the province of Hohenzollern, Alfons Scherer, informed the authorities in a circular dated July 9, 1928 that after the death of his father, Frederick had no right to either the predicate Highness nor the title Prince of Hohenzollern, arguing that the title had expired in 1927 with the death of Wilhelm Prince of Hohenzollern. This was resolved when Frederick threatened the city of Sigmaringen with moving his administration to Munich, prompting Minister of the Interior Carl Severing to put Scherer on leave. Despite the adverse conditions during the global economic crisis of the early 1930s, Frederick managed to secure ownership of the family properties and its businesses, especially the extensive forest holdings in East Germany. He managed to buy back part of the art treasures that his father had already sold and thus save the Hohenzollern art collection. Frederick was honorary chairman of the Silesian Maltese Knights of Law and head of the Stahlhelm in Württemberg and Baden. His affinity for cultivating military traditions led to a rapprochement with the Nazis. His younger twin brother joined the SS and in 1935 the Nazi state awarded Frederick the title of Royal Highness. He was however forbidden to serve in the German military because of Hitler's 1940 Prinzenerlass decree.

Marriage and children

He married Princess Margarete Karola of Saxony, daughter of Frederick Augustus III of Saxony and Archduchess Luise, Princess of Tuscany, on 2 June 1920 in Schloss Sibyllenort, Silesia, Germany. Margarete's sister Princess Maria Alix of Saxony subsequently married his twin brother, Francis Joseph.

Frederick and Margarete Karola had seven children:

Princess Benedikta Maria Antonia Mathilde Anna of Hohenzollern (born 19 February 1921 in Sigmaringen; died 11 October 2011 in Sigmaringen), married Heinrich Maria, Count von Waldburg zu Wolfegg und Waldsee (born 16 September 1911 in Wolfegg; died 25 May 1972 in Stuttgart) on 4 January 1942, and had ten children (seven daughters and three sons)
Princess Maria Adelgunde Alice Luise Josephine of Hohenzollern (born 19 February 1921 in Sigmaringen; died 23 May 2006 in Frauenfeld), married in 1942 (div 1948) Prince Konstantin of Bavaria
Princess Maria Theresia Ludovika Cecilie Zita Elisabeth Hilda Agnes of Hohenzollern (born 11 October 1922 at Schloss Sigmaringen; died 13 December 2004)
Prince Friedrich Wilhelm Ferdinand Joseph Maria Manuel Georg Meinrad Fidelis Benedikt Michael Hubert of Hohenzollern (born 3 February 1924 at Schloss Umkirch; died 16 September 2010)
Prince Franz Josef Hubertus Maria Meinrad Michael of Hohenzollern (born 15 March 1926 at Schloss Umkirch; died 13 March 1996 in Sigmaringen), married 1st 1950 (div 1951) Princess Maria Ferdinande von Thurn und Taxis (born 19 December 1927; died 9 June 2018) and 2nd (civ) London 15 March 1955 (rel) Krauchenwies 16 April 1955 (div 1961) Princess Diana of Bourbon-Parma (born 22 May 1932 in Paris; died 4 May 2020 in Bad Krozingen), daughter of Prince Gaetano of Bourbon-Parma (youngest child of Robert I, Duke of Parma) 
Prince Johann Georg Carl Leopold Eitel-Friedrich Meinrad Maria Hubertus Michael of Hohenzollern (born 31 July 1932 at Schloss Sigmaringen; died 2 March 2016 in Munich) husband of Princess Birgitta of Sweden, sister of current  King of Sweden. 
Prince Ferfried Maximilian Pius Meinrad Maria Hubert Michael Justinus of Hohenzollern (born 14 April 1943 at Schloss Umkirch; died 27 September 2022 at Großhadern Clinic in Munich)

Romanian succession 
In 1948, soon after the deposition of king Michael of Romania the line of succession was discussed during a meeting between Michael, his uncle Prince Nicholas of Romania, and Prince Frederick. Shortly after this meeting, the spokesman of King Carol II, in an interview with the French paper Le Figaro, expressed his strong support for Prince Frederick, additionally asserting that Michael would never regain the throne.

Honours 
He received the following awards:

Ancestry

References

External links
Hohenzollern website

1891 births
1965 deaths
Princes of Hohenzollern
House of Hohenzollern-Sigmaringen
German landowners
People from Mecklenburg-Schwerin
Recipients of the Iron Cross, 1st class
Knights of the Golden Fleece of Austria